Daniel Manzato (born 17 January 1984) is a Swiss professional ice hockey goaltender who currently plays for SC Bern in the National League (NL). He was drafted 160th overall in the 2002 NHL Entry Draft by the Carolina Hurricanes.

Playing career
During the 2014–15 season, on January 5, 2015, Manzato signed a three-year contract extension to the remain in Lugano until 2018.

Manzato joined HC Ambrì-Piotta for the 2018/19 season on a two-year deal.

On December 12, 2019, in his final year of his contract with Ambri, Manzato agreed to a one-year deal with Genève-Servette HC for the 2020/21 season.

On March 11, 2021, Manzato agreed to a one-year deal with SC Bern for the 2021/22 season.

International play
Manzato participated at the 2010 IIHF World Championship as a member of the Switzerland men's national ice hockey team.

Personal life
Born and raised in the  French-speaking part of Switzerland, he speaks German as well as Italian, being of Italian descent and having lived for about six years in the Italian-speaking Canton of Ticino.

References

External links

1984 births
Living people
Albany River Rats players
HC Ambrì-Piotta players
EHC Basel players
SC Bern players
Carolina Hurricanes draft picks
Charlotte Checkers (1993–2010) players
People from Fribourg
EHC Kloten players
Las Vegas Wranglers players
HC Lugano players
SC Rapperswil-Jona Lakers players
Swiss ice hockey goaltenders
Swiss people of Italian descent
Victoriaville Tigres players
Sportspeople from the canton of Fribourg